Saint Rita Point is a point terminating in a steep rock outcrop immediately north of the mouth of Gourdon Glacier, on the east coast of James Ross Island. The name "Cabo Santa Rita" appears on a 1959 Argentine map. Saint Rita (1381–1457), an Italian, was canonized in 1900 and is well known throughout the Spanish-speaking world as the saint of desperate causes.

Headlands of James Ross Island